ŠK Odeva Lipany is a Slovak football club, playing in the town of Lipany.

History
 1925 Club Founded 
 1929 Renamed ŠK Lipany
 1937 Renamed ŠK Slávia Lipany
 1946 Renamed  ŠK Sokol Lipany
 1960 Renamed TJ Odeva Lipany
 1990 Renamed FK Odeva Lipany
 1994 Renamed FK Odeva Dukla Lipany
 Renamed ŠK Odeva Lipany

Notable players

Had international caps for their respective countries. Players whose name is listed in bold represented their countries while playing for ŠK.
  	
 Miroslav Drobňák
 Martin Jakubko
 Ján Krivák
 Stanislav Varga
 Adam Zreľák

References

External links
Official website

Odeva Lipany
Association football clubs established in 1925
1925 establishments in Slovakia